Vechoor  is a village in Vaikom taluk, Kottayam district in the state of Kerala, India. Vechoor is a short drive away from one of Kerala's tourist destinations, Kumarakom. The Vechur Cow breed of cattle is named after this village.

Geography
Vechoor village covers a total area of 2,913 hectares. Vechoor is bordered by Vembanattu lake on the west and Kaipuzha river on south. Thanneermukkom Bund starts from Vechoor. The eastern part of Vechoor is majorly covered by paddy fields. There are many natural and man made canals in Vechoor which were used for water transport and irrigation.

Transport links
Until 1985, road connectivity to Vechoor was limited and bus services from Vaikom used to stop at Vechoor. A road bridge alongside Thanneermukkom Bund connected Vechoor to Alleppey district in 1985. In 2003, Vechoor got connected directly to Kottayam via Kumarakom. Renovation of Kallara - Vechoor road added further connectivity. Vechoor is about 10 km from both the towns Vaikom and Cherthala. Kottayam and Alappuzha are about 20 kilometres away. There are regular bus services to all the towns. Bundroad junction is a major junction in the village where Vaikom - Vechoor road meets road to Cherthala. Kaippuzhamuttu is a bus hub where many bus services terminate.

A mega infrastructure road project is being planned through vechoor connecting Cherthala to Manarcaud

Water transport
Swamikkallu boat jetty on western coast of Vechoor used to have regular services connecting Ernakulam, Vaikom, Thanneermukkom, Mannanam and Kottayam. Also hand rowed boats were regularly used for transport of goods till end of the 20th century. However the improvement of road transport reduced the importance of inland water transport. The boat jetty is now a hub for tourist houseboats.

Railway station
The nearest railway station is Cherthala on the Ernakulam-Kayamkulam coastal line which is 12 kilometers away. Cochin International Airport is 70 km away.

Education institutions
 Government Devivilasam Higher secondary school
 St. Michael's Higher secondary school
 Govt. Highschool Vechoor (known as Perumana school)
 St. Mary's Lower Primary School 
 St George Lower Primary School
 Hindi Premi Mandal of Dakshin Bharath Hindi Prachar Sabha (closed down)

N.S.S High school Vechoor is not located in Vechoor despite the name.

Religious institutions
 St. Mary's Church (Vechoor Palli)
 Govindhapuram Sreekrishna Swami temple
 Sasthakkulam Devi Temple
 Poonkavu Devi Temple
 Ansarul Islam Juma Masjid Achinakom
 Cherakulangara Devi Temple
 Idayazham Subramanya Swami Temple
 Muchoorkkavu Temple
 Vaikundapuram Sreekrishna Temple

Notable personalities
 Vechoor Harihara Subramania Iyer, a Karnatic singer
 Harikrishnan,  Malayalam film actor
 Vechoor Kunjan Panicker, Famous Thullal Artist.
 Vaikom Thankappan Pilla, Famous Kathakali Singer [Vaikom Brothers]
 Vaikom Purushothaman Nair, Famous Kathakali Singer [Vaikom Brothers]
 C. K. Asha, Member of Kerala Legislative Assembly
 Dalit Bandhu N. K. Jose: Historian known for his studies in Dalit and Christian history.

Demographics
As per 2011 census, Vechoor had a population of 17041 with 8,315 males and 8,726 females. In 2001, Vechoor had a population of 16,830 with 8,305 males and 8,525 females. After 2010, several migrant workers arrived in Vechoor particularly from West Bengal and Bihar

References

Villages in Kottayam district